First Ladies of Disco is an American girl supergroup originally composed of Martha Wash, Linda Clifford, and Evelyn "Champagne" King. The group was formed in 2015 by James Washington, Wash's manager. Their group name was inspired by James Arena's book First Ladies of Disco: 32 Stars Discuss the Era and Their Singing Careers (2013), which includes interviews from the individual members of the group. In March 2015, the First Ladies of Disco released their debut single "Show Some Love" on Wash's record label Purple Rose Records. A remix of the single peaked at number six on Billboard's Dance chart.

In 2017, the group embarked on their first tour called "First Ladies of Disco Show". In December 2017, King left the group and was replaced with former Chic vocalist Norma Jean Wright in February 2018. In March 2019, the group released their second single "Don't Stop Me Now".

Discography

Singles

Tours
 First Ladies of Disco Show (2017-2019)

References

External links
 
 
 

African-American girl groups
American dance music groups
American disco groups
American musical trios
American pop girl groups
American soul musical groups
American supergroups
Pop music supergroups
Musical groups established in 2015
Vocal trios
American women in electronic music
2015 establishments in New York City